MHX, Mhx or mhx may refer to:

 Manihiki Island Airport, Cook Islands (IATA code MHX)
 Maru language, spoken in Burma and China (ISO 639 code mhx)
 Monster Hunter X, a video game